HD 210277 is a single star in the equatorial constellation of Aquarius. It has an apparent visual magnitude of 6.54, which makes it a challenge to view with the naked eye, but it is easily visible in binoculars. The star is located at a distance of 69.5 light years from the Sun based on parallax, but is drifting closer with a radial velocity of −20.9 km/s.

An early classification of this star was a G0 dwarf, and some sources still use this value. More modern classification surveys list it as G8V, matching a late G-type main-sequence star. It is older than the Sun with a very low level of chromospheric activity and is spinning with a projected rotational velocity of 1.9 km/s. The star has a slightly higher mass and larger radius than the Sun.

Planetary system
In 1999 it was announced that a dust disk orbiting HD 210277, similar to that produced by the Kuiper Belt, had been imaged, lying between 30 and 62 AU from the star. However, observations with the Spitzer Space Telescope failed to detect any infrared excess at 70 micrometres or at 24 micrometres wavelengths. Subsequent measurements by the Herschel Space Observatory did detect an excess at 100 and 160 micrometres. A model fit to the emission matches a disk orbiting at 160 AU with a mean temperature of 22 K. The disk signal is fairly strong, with S/N equal to 6.6.

The only known exoplanet was discovered using 34 radial velocity measurements taken from 1996 to 1998 at W. M. Keck Observatory. It has a minimum mass greater than Jupiter orbiting the star in 442 days. The high eccentricity (ovalness) of the exoplanet's orbit means it is unlikely that there is a companion planet co-orbiting the star at a trojan point.

References

External links
 Image HD 210277
 jumk.de

G-type main-sequence stars
Planetary systems with one confirmed planet
Circumstellar disks

Aquarius (constellation)
BD-08 5818
9769
210277
109378
J22092985-0732548